Tarkan is a Turkish given name. Notable persons with that name include:

Tarkan (singer) (born 1972), German-Turkish pop singer (full name: Tarkan Tevetoğlu)
Tarkan Gözübüyük (born 1970), Turkish guitarist
Tarkan Mustafa (born 1973), English footballer
Tarkan Tüzmen (born 1968), Turkish singer and actor

See also
Tarkan (disambiguation)

Turkish masculine given names